San Fransicko: Why Progressives Ruin Cities is a 2021 book by Michael Shellenberger. The book discusses homelessness and crime.

Reception 
Several reviewers have noted the book's heterodox approach to progressive policies. Several reviewers have also criticized Shellenberger's views on the causes of homelessness and raised issues with where the book casts blame.

Manhattan Institute fellow Charles Fain Lehman summarized Shellenberger's topic: "Many major municipalities are marred by violent crime, homelessness, uncontrolled mental illness, and general disorder. This all in spite of an ever-advancing cadre of progressive leaders, who promise their latest tax hike will finally target the 'root causes' of the breakdown." Benjamin Schneider, writing in the San Francisco Examiner, described the book's thesis as "[P]rogressives have embraced 'victimology,' a belief system wherein society’s downtrodden are subject to no rules or consequences for their actions. This ideology, cultivated in cities like San Francisco for decades and widely adopted over the past two years, is the key to understanding, and thus solving, our crises of homelessness, drug overdoses and crime."

Wes Enzinna, writing in The New York Times, charged that Shellenberger "does exactly what he accuses his left-wing enemies of doing: ignoring facts, best practices and complicated and heterodox approaches in favor of dogma." Olga Khazan, writing in The Atlantic, said that "The problem—or opportunity—for Shellenberger is that virtually every homelessness expert disagrees with him. ('Like an internet troll that's written a book' is how Jennifer Friedenbach, the executive director of San Francisco's Coalition on Homelessness, described him to me.)". Tim Stanley, writing in The Daily Telegraph, described it as a "revelatory, must-read book", but added "There is much in the argument for liberal readers to contest."

References 

2021 non-fiction books
Homelessness in the United States
San Francisco
HarperCollins books